George William Frederick Howard, 7th Earl of Carlisle,  (18 April 1802– 5 December 1864), styled Viscount Morpeth from 1825 to 1848, was a British statesman, orator, and writer.

Life
Carlisle was born in Westminster, London, the eldest son of George Howard, 6th Earl of Carlisle by his wife Lady Georgiana Cavendish, eldest daughter of William Cavendish, 5th Duke of Devonshire. Lord Lanerton and Charles Howard were his younger brothers. He was educated at Eton and Christ Church, Oxford, where he earned a reputation as a scholar and writer of graceful verse, obtaining in 1821 both the chancellor's and the Newdigate prizes for a Latin poem, Paestum, and an English one. He maintained his interest in poetry throughout his life, exchanging sonnets with William Wordsworth. In 1826 he accompanied his maternal uncle, the Duke of Devonshire, to the Russian Empire, to attend the coronation of Tsar Nicholas I, and became a great favourite in society at St Petersburg.

At the general election in 1826 Carlisle was returned to parliament as member for the family borough of Morpeth (in Northumberland), a seat he held until 1830, and then represented Yorkshire until 1832 and the West Riding of Yorkshire from 1832 to 1841 and from 1846 to 1848. The latter year he succeeded his father in the earldom and entered the House of Lords.

Carlisle served under Lord Melbourne as Chief Secretary for Ireland between 1835 and 1841, under Lord John Russell as First Commissioner of Woods and Forests from 1846 to 1850 and as Chancellor of the Duchy of Lancaster from 1850 to 1852 and under Lord Palmerston as Lord Lieutenant of Ireland from 1855 to 1858 and again from 1859 to 1864. In 1835 he was appointed to the Privy Councils of the United Kingdom and Ireland. He served as a Lord in Waiting to the Queen's mother, the Duchess of Kent at the coronation of Queen Victoria in 1838. 

On 2 April 1853, he was given the Freedom of the City of Edinburgh, and in 1855, he was made a Knight of the Garter.

In the six weeks after he stepped down as Chief Secretary of Ireland in 1841, the signatures of 160,000 men and women who appreciated his service were gathered on 652 sheets of paper and stuck together, creating the Morpeth Roll, a continuous roll measuring 420 metres. 

Lord Carlisle died unmarried at Castle Howard in December 1864, aged 62, and was buried in the family mausoleum. He was succeeded in the earldom by his younger brother, Reverend William George Howard.

Legacy
On Bulmer Hill, about a mile from Bulmer village in North Yorkshire, is the Carlisle Memorial Column, erected by public subscription to his memory in 1869–70. It is inscribed:

Statues of him by the Irish sculptor John Henry Foley were also erected in Phoenix Park, Dublin, and in Brampton, Carlisle in Cumbria, both in 1870. The statue in Brampton stands on Brampton motte and depicts him in the robes of a Knight of the Garter. The statue in Phoenix Park stood in the Peoples' Garden until 1956, when it was blown off its plinth in an explosion, and subsequently removed to Castle Howard in Yorkshire. The plinth it once stood on remains in place.

Notes

References

External links 
 
 Biography
 Obituary in the Sidney Mail
 Extracts from journals kept by George Howard, earl of Carlisle: selected by his sister, Lady Caroline Lascelles
 

1802 births
1864 deaths
People from Westminster
George Howard, 7th Earl of Carlisle
Alumni of Christ Church, Oxford
Chancellors of the Duchy of Lancaster
07
Knights of the Garter
Lord-Lieutenants of the East Riding of Yorkshire
Lords Lieutenant of Ireland
Members of the Privy Council of Ireland
Members of the Privy Council of the United Kingdom
Morpeth, George Howard, Viscount
People educated at Eton College
Rectors of the University of Aberdeen
Morpeth, George Howard, Viscount
Morpeth, George Howard, Viscount
Morpeth, George Howard, Viscount
Morpeth, George Howard, Viscount
Morpeth, George Howard, Viscount
Morpeth, George Howard, Viscount
Morpeth, George Howard, Viscount
Morpeth, George Howard, Viscount
Carlisle, E7
Fellows of the Royal Society
Chief Secretaries for Ireland
Fellows of the Royal Society of Literature
Presidents of the Royal Society of Literature